Deh-e Khoda Rahm (also Romanized as Deh-e Khodā Raḩm; also known as Deh-e Khodā Raḩīm) is a village in Margan Rural District, in the Central District of Hirmand County, Sistan and Baluchestan Province, Iran. At the 2006 census, its population was 26, in 5 families.

References 

Populated places in Hirmand County